Sandri is an Italian surname. Notable people with the surname include:

Anna Maria Sandri (born 1936), Italian actress
Carl Sandri (born 1983), Australian-born Italian cricketer
Clemente Ascanio Sandri-Trotti (died 1675), Italian Roman Catholic prelate, Bishop of Fossano 
Leonardo Sandri (born 1943), Argentine Cardinal of the Catholic Church
Lionello Levi Sandri (1910–1991), Italian politician and European Commissioner
Lori Sandri (1949–2014), Brazilian football manager
Mervin Sandri (born 1932), New Zealand former cricketer
Pepler Sandri, South African cricketer
Sandro Sandri (born 1954), Italian politician

Italian-language surnames
Patronymic surnames
Surnames from given names